Marcel-Ernest Bidault (born 11 May 1938) was a French cyclist. He competed in the team time trial at the 1964 Summer Olympics.

References

1938 births
Living people
French male cyclists
Olympic cyclists of France
Cyclists at the 1964 Summer Olympics
UCI Road World Champions (elite men)